The 1969 Nevada Wolf Pack football team represented the University of Nevada, Reno during the 1969 NCAA College Division football season. Nevada competed as an independent. The Wolf Pack were led by first-year head coach Jerry Scattini and played their home games at Mackay Stadium.

Schedule

References

Nevada
Nevada Wolf Pack football seasons
Nevada Wolf Pack football